Krab or KRAB may refer to:
 Krab (surname)
 Crab stick, or krab, processed seafood 
 Russian submarine Krab
 AHS Krab, a Polish 155mm self-propelled howitzer
 KRAB, a radio station in Greenacres, California, U.S.
 KRAB, a former radio station in Seattle, Washington, U.S., whose legacy is KSER
 Krüppel associated box (KRAB), a transcription repression protein domain

See also
 Crab (disambiguation)
 Mr. Krabs, a character in SpongeBob SquarePants
Krusty Krab, a fictional fast food restaurant
 Krabby, a Pokémon 
 Krabbe disease
 Carabiner, or karabiner, a specialized type of shackle